The 2020 Internationaux de Strasbourg was a professional tennis tournament played on clay courts. It was the 34th edition of the tournament and part of the International-level tournament category of the 2020 WTA Tour. It took place at the Tennis Club de Strasbourg in Strasbourg, France, between 20 and 26 September 2020.

Points and prize money

Prize money

Singles main draw entrants

Seeds

 Rankings are as of September 14, 2020.

Other entrants
The following players received wildcards into the singles main draw:
  Kiki Bertens
  Clara Burel
  Pauline Parmentier

The following player received entry into the singles main draw using a protected ranking:
  Kateryna Bondarenko

The following players received entry from the qualifying draw:
  Christina McHale 
  Greet Minnen
  Ellen Perez
  Zhang Shuai

The following players received entry as a lucky loser:
  Myrtille Georges
  Storm Sanders

Withdrawals
  Jennifer Brady → replaced by  Polona Hercog
  Julia Görges → replaced by  Alison Van Uytvanck
  Sofia Kenin → replaced by  Alizé Cornet
  Anett Kontaveit → replaced by  Kateřina Siniaková
  Veronika Kudermetova → replaced by  Lauren Davis
  Karolína Plíšková → replaced by  Kateryna Bondarenko
  Yulia Putintseva → replaced by  Anna Blinkova
  Alison Riske → replaced by  Jil Teichmann
  Anastasija Sevastova → replaced by  Ajla Tomljanović
  Barbora Strýcová → replaced by  Myrtille Georges
  Markéta Vondroušová → replaced by  Zarina Diyas
  Zheng Saisai → replaced by  Storm Sanders

Doubles main draw entrants

Seeds 

 1 Rankings as of August 17, 2020.

Other entrants 
The following pair received a wildcard into the doubles main draw:
  Clara Burel /  Diane Parry 

The following pair received entry using a protected ranking:
  Kateryna Bondarenko /  Sharon Fichman

Withdrawals 
  Alison Van Uytvanck

Finals

Singles

  Elina Svitolina def.  Elena Rybakina, 6–4, 1–6, 6–2.

This was Svitolina's 15th WTA Tour singles title, and second of the year.

Doubles

  Nicole Melichar /  Demi Schuurs def.  Hayley Carter /  Luisa Stefani, 6–4, 6–3.
This was Melichar's 8th career WTA doubles title, and second of the year, and was Schuurs' 12th career WTA doubles title, and second of the year. This was their first title as a pair.

References

 Official website

2020 WTA Tour
2020
2020 in French tennis
Internationaux de Strasbourg
Tennis events postponed due to the COVID-19 pandemic